KISD (98.7 FM) is a radio station broadcasting an oldies format. The station serves the Pipestone and Worthington areas, with rimshot coverage in the Marshall and Sioux Falls areas. The station is currently owned by Collin Christensen and Carmen Christensen, through licensee Christensen Broadcasting, LLC. KISD derives a portion of its programming from Scott Shannon's The True Oldies Channel from ABC Radio.

History
The station was assigned the call sign KLOH on April 15, 1980. On September 16, 1987, the station changed its call sign to the current KISD.

References

External links
KISD official website

Radio stations in Minnesota
Oldies radio stations in the United States